Stoney is an impact crater on the Moon, located in the southern part of its far side, approximately 47.5 kilometers in diameter. In 1970, it was named by IAU's Working Group for Planetary System Nomenclature after Anglo-Irish physicist George Johnstone Stoney (1826–1911). It lies to the southeast of the crater Baldet and to the east of Bhabha.

The rim of this crater is sharp-edged but with a somewhat irregular lip that has slumped in places. There are small outward bulges in the rim to the east and northwest. The inner wall is uneven with diagonal grooves and heaps where the material has slumped. The interior floor is also somewhat uneven, especially in the eastern half. There are two small craterlets within the interior, located at the base of the northeast and southern inner walls.

References

Bibliography

 
 
 
 
 
 
 
 
 
 
 
 

Impact craters on the Moon